Francis J. "Frank" Larkin III (born May 9, 1955) served as the 40th Sergeant at Arms of the United States Senate after his nomination by Senate Majority Leader Mitch McConnell on January 6, 2015, succeeding Andrew B. Willison. Larkin assumed his post as Sergeant at Arms after a distinguished career in both the public and private sector, including work in law enforcement, national security, information technology and cyber security. McConnell nominated Michael C. Stenger to succeed Larkin on April 16, 2018.

Larkin previously served in several posts at the United States Department of Defense and law enforcement. Prior to assuming office, he served in the United States Navy completing Basic Underwater Demolition/SEAL (BUD/S) training class 84 in 1975. Larkin is entitled to wear the SEAL Trident. Larkin served as a Navy SEAL from 1975 to 1981.  Larkin joined the United States Secret Service (USSS) in 1984 as a Special Agent assigned to the Philadelphia Field Office. Larkin was subsequently transferred to Washington, D.C., where he held positions in the Office of Training, the Washington Field Office and the Presidential Protective Division. Larkin retired from the Secret Service in 2006.

Larkin holds a Bachelor of Arts degree in Criminal Justice and a Master of Public Administration degree from Villanova University.

Larkin is currently a practicing volunteer paramedic in Calvert County, Maryland.

References

Citations
 Senate Sergeant-at-Arms Larkin on His 9/11 Heroics (Roll Call article) 
 McConnell’s Sergeant-at-Arms Team’s Time Together Goes Way Back (Audio) (Roll Call article)

External links

1955 births
Living people
Villanova University alumni
Military personnel from Philadelphia
United States Navy sailors
United States Navy SEALs personnel
American police officers
People from Annapolis, Maryland
United States Secret Service agents
Sergeants at Arms of the United States Senate